The 1905–06 City Cup was the twelfth edition of the City Cup, a cup competition in Irish football.

The tournament was won by Belfast Celtic for the first time. They defeated Linfield and Cliftonville in separate test matches after all three teams finished level on points in the table.

Group standings

References

1905–06 in Irish association football